Rich Creek is an unincorporated community in Marshall County, in the U.S. state of Tennessee. A variant name was "Richcreek".

History
A post office called Rich Creek was established in 1872, and remained in operation until 1904. Besides the post office, the community had a country store.

References

Unincorporated communities in Marshall County, Tennessee
Unincorporated communities in Tennessee